Rugge may refer to:

 Rügge, a municipality in Schleswig-Holstein, Germany
 Rugge, a locality in the east of Avelgem, Belgium
 Rugge-Price baronets, a title in the Baronetage of the United Kingdom created in 1804

People with the surname
 Fabio Rugge (born 1951), Italian academic, rector and public health manager
 Jesse Rugge (born 1979), one of the former members of Jesse James Hollywood's gang who helped in the murder of Nicholas Markowitz
 Robert Rugge (1503-1559), English politician and Member of Parliament